Oyster Bed Bridge is an unincorporated rural community in the township of Lot 24, Queens County, Prince Edward Island, Canada.

References

Communities in Queens County, Prince Edward Island